Brachyona is a monotypic moth genus of the family Erebidae. Its only species, Brachyona xylodesma, is known from the Australian state of Western Australia and the Northern Territory. Both the genus and the species were first described by George Hampson in 1926.

References

Calpinae
Monotypic moth genera